A Wolf in Preacher's Clothes is an album by Jon DeRosa.

Track listing

References

Jon DeRosa albums
2012 albums